The Studio (also known as the Mushroom House) is an ornately fanciful home built by architect Terry Brown in the Hyde Park neighborhood of Cincinnati, Ohio.  The one-bedroom house features a cone shaped addition and a spiral staircase entry.

It was built between 1992 and 2006. The structure as it is currently was completed in 2016. The Studio served as the architect's office and secondary residence until his death in 2008.

References

External links
 Photo-links

Houses in Cincinnati